Jean-André is a French masculine given name. It may refer to:

 Jean-André Cuoq (1821–1898), French philologist 
 Jean-André Deluc (1727–1817), Swiss geologist and meteorologist 
 Jean-André Mongez (1750–1788), French priest and mineralogist
 Jean-André Rixens (1846–1925), French painter

See also 
 Jean (male given name)
 André

French masculine given names
Compound given names